Fannie Dorothy Davenport (March 13, 1895 – October 12, 1977) was an American actress, screenwriter, film director, and producer.

Born into a family of film performers, Davenport had her own independent career before her marriage to the film actor and director Wallace Reid in 1913.  Reid's star rose steadily, making feature films at a pace of one every seven weeks, until 1919 when a dose of morphine administered for an injury on location grew into an addiction.  Reid died in January 1923 at the age of 31.  Davenport took her own story as source material and co-produced Human Wreckage (1923), in which she was billed as "Mrs. Wallace Reid" and played the role of a drug addict's wife.  She advertised the film in terms of a moral crusade.

Davenport followed its success with other social-conscience films on other topics, Broken Laws (1924) and The Red Kimono (1925), with expensive litigation connected with the latter.  While Davenport's own production company dissolved in the late 1920s, she continued to take on smaller writing and directing roles. In 1929 Davenport directed Linda, a film about a woman who gives up her happiness for the sake of men and social expectations. Davenport directed her last film in 1934; however, she continued in the film industry in other roles until her last known credit in 1956 as dialogue supervisor of The First Traveling Saleslady.

Early career 

Dorothy Davenport was born in Boston, Massachusetts on March 13, 1895. Davenport's father, Harry Davenport, was a Broadway star and comedian, and her mother, Alice Davenport was a film actress who appeared in at least 140 films.  Dorothy's grandparents were 19th-century character actors, Edward Loomis Davenport, a successful tragedian stage actor, and Fanny Vining Davenport, who began acting at the age of three. Their daughter and Dorothy's aunt, Fanny Davenport, was considered one of the great stage actresses of the time.

Davenport's first professional role was in a stock company at the age of six. At age fourteen, Davenport continued in the entertainment industry, doing a type of burlesque.

Davenport attended school in Brooklyn and Roanoke, Virginia. At the age of 16, after performing vaudeville for a year and a half, she moved from Boston to Southern California to pursue acting. She began her career with the Nestor Film Company, later acquired by Universal Pictures. Her first known film appearance was in Life Cycle in a supporting role.  She was a talented horsewoman and did many of her own stunts in films.

While with Nestor, Davenport met a young actor named Wallace Reid on the set of a film. "Called on to act with him in a film, she was frustrated by his apparent lack of acting ability on the first day but was smitten with him on the third day of their work together." Both were prominent during Nestor's early years. Even though Wallace Reid left for six months to make another film, he promptly returned to Nestor and the pair married in October 1913.

The following year they worked on over a hundred films together. After this year, the pair left Universal to work on other films but returned in 1916. On June 18, 1917, Davenport gave birth to her first son, Wallace Reid Jr., in Los Angeles. The birth of her son caused Davenport to take a step back from her career, and become a full-time mother. In 1920, Davenport and Reid adopted their second child, daughter Betty Anna Reid.

Later career 

While filming on location in Oregon for The Valley of the Giants (1919), Wallace Reid was injured in a train wreck. As a remedy for this injury's pain, studio doctors administered large doses of morphine to Reid, to which he became addicted. Reid's health slowly grew worse over the next few years, and he died of the addiction in 1923.

After Reid's death, Davenport and Thomas Ince co-produced the film Human Wreckage (1923) with James Kirkwood, Sr., Bessie Love and Lucille Ricksen, a film that dealt with the dangers of narcotics addiction. It was developed and marketed with expert assistance from members of the Los Angeles Anti-Narcotics League.  Davenport took Human Wreckage on a roadshow engagement with personal appearances, followed up with another "social conscience" picture about excessive mother-love called Broken Laws in 1924, again billed as "Mrs. Wallace Reid".

Davenport then produced The Red Kimono (1925) about white slavery.  Both Human Wreckage and The Red Kimono were banned in the United Kingdom by the British Board of Film Censors in 1926.  Kimono is based on a real case of prostitution that took place in New Orleans in 1917.  Billing it as a true story, Davenport used the real name of the woman played by Priscilla Bonner, who as a consequence sued Davenport and won a landmark privacy case.

She later continued in the social-consciousness line with films Linda (1929), Sucker Money (1933), Road to Ruin (1934), and The Woman Condemned (1934), and worked as a producer, writer, and dialogue director. Among her last credits is the co-author of the screenplay for Footsteps in the Fog (1955), and as dialogue director for The First Traveling Saleslady (1956) with Ginger Rogers. In the 1970s, near the end of her life, Dorothy still had a print of her husband's 1921 feature Forever. She gave the print to an organization planning a museum. The museum plans fell through, and Dorothy's last remaining print of Wally's favorite movie was lost.

On October 12, 1977, Davenport died at the Motion Picture & Television Country House and Hospital in Woodland Hills, California, aged 82. She is interred with her husband at Forest Lawn Memorial Park, Glendale.

Select filmography

References

External links 

 
 Dorothy Davenport Reid at the Women Film Pioneers Project
 

1895 births
1977 deaths
American film actresses
American film directors
Film producers from Massachusetts
Screenwriters from Massachusetts
American silent film actresses
American women film directors
Actresses from Boston
American women screenwriters
20th-century American actresses
Burials at Forest Lawn Memorial Park (Glendale)
Women film pioneers
American women film producers
20th-century American women writers
20th-century American screenwriters
Universal Pictures contract players